Akdala (Aqdala) is an agricultural village in Almaty Region of south-eastern Kazakhstan. It is located to the north-west of Talgar. The village has a small lake located in the southern part. Extensive fields separate it from Talgar.

External links
Tageo.com

Populated places in Almaty Region